Dardistown is a townland in the civil parish of Santry that is located in Fingal, Ireland. This small populated area is located south-east of Dublin Airport.

One of the long term car parks of Dublin Airport is located in the townland. Dardistown Cemetery is located on the Collinstown section of the old Swords Road.

Two streams, the Cuckoo Stream and the Turnapin Stream, pass through Dardistown; they later meet to form the Mayne River.

Dardistown was intended to the site of a station on the proposed Dublin Metro, with Metro West terminating there, and Metro North passing via Dardistown to St Stephen's Green and northwards to Swords. However, in an announcement in 2011, the Minister for Transport, Tourism and Sport, Leo Varadkar, said that the plans for Metro North would be deferred 'until further notice' due to the recession.

References

Townlands of Fingal